Siqueira is a Portuguese surname. Notable people with the surname include:

Cláudio Roberto Siqueira Fernandes Brazilian footballer
Guilherme Siqueira Brazilian footballer
Luciano Siqueira de Oliveira Brazilian footballer
Marco Aurélio Siqueira Brazilian footballer
Henri Siqueira Swiss footballer

Portuguese-language surnames